Phoebe spegazzinii is a species of beetle in the family Cerambycidae. It was described by Bruch in 1908. It is known from Argentina, Brazil and Paraguay.

References

Hemilophini
Beetles described in 1908